The following is a list of notable deaths in May 2012.

Entries for each day are listed alphabetically by surname.  A typical entry lists information in the following sequence:
Name, age, country of citizenship and reason for notability, established cause of death, reference (and language of reference, if not English).

May 2012

1
Gonçalo Amorim, 39, Portuguese Olympic cyclist. 
Gogó Andreu, 92, Argentine comedian and actor. 
Cali Carranza, 59, American Tejano musician, amyotrophic lateral sclerosis. 
Harold L. Colburn Jr., 86, American physician and politician.
Gale Dixon, 65–66, American actress and singer, pancreatic cancer.
Joseph Erhardy, 83, American sculptor.
Gord Fashoway, 85, Canadian ice hockey player.
Rufina Gasheva, 90, Soviet Russian flight navigator.
John Spencer Hardy, 98, American lieutenant general, NATO commander for Southern Europe.
Harold K. Hoskins, 85, American pilot, Tuskegee Airman, Congressional Gold Medal winner, complications from a fall.
Greg Jackson, 60, American basketball player (New York Knicks, Phoenix Suns), heart attack.
Eric James, 87, British Anglican clergyman and broadcaster.
Senteza Kajubi, 86, Ugandan university administrator and academic.
James Kinley, 86, Canadian engineer and industrialist, Lieutenant Governor of Nova Scotia (1994–2000).
Daniel Mulumba, 49, Ugandan Olympic swimmer.
Viktoras Petkus, 83, Lithuanian political activist and dissident.
Charles Pitts, 65, American soul musician, guitarist for Isaac Hayes, lung cancer.
Harriet Presser, 76, American sociologist and demographer.
Earl Rose, 85, American medical examiner, attempted to autopsy President Kennedy after assassination, Parkinson's disease.
Shanmugasundari, 75, Indian film actress, heart attack.
Mordechai Virshubski, 82, Israeli politician, MK (1977–1992) and Deputy Speaker of the Knesset (1988–1992).
Arnold Manaaki Wilson, 83, New Zealand artist and educator.

2
Bram Bogart, 90, Dutch-born Belgian painter.
Michel Boudart, 87, American chemical engineer.
William Francis Brace, 85, American geophysicist.
Ranjit Cheema, Canadian gangster and drug trader, shot.
Razia Matin Chowdhury, 87, Bangladeshi politician, old age complications.
Peter Connolly, 77, British historian.
Shirin Darasha, 73, Indian theatre director, pulmonary fibrosis.
Mark Deutch, 67, Russian journalist, drowned. 
Andrew Ganigan, 59, American former NABF lightweight champion boxer, cancer. 
Nélida Gómez de Navajas, 84, Argentine human rights activist (Grandmothers of the Plaza de Mayo). 
Fernando Lopes, 76, Portuguese film director, throat cancer. 
Zenaida Manfugás, 80, Cuban-born American pianist. 
James Marker, 90, American-born Canadian businessman, inventor of Cheezies.
Charlotte Mitchell, 85, British actress.
Tufan Miñnullin, 76, Russian Tatar writer and playwright, heart attack. 
Les Mogg, 82, Australian football player.
Donald L. Owens, 82, American military officer.
Ernst Rau, 85, German Olympic fencer.
J. T. Ready, 39, American border militia leader, former neo-Nazi, suicide by gunshot.
Tracy Reed, 69, English actress (Dr. Strangelove, Casino Royale), cancer. 
Junior Seau, 43, American football player (San Diego Chargers, Miami Dolphins, New England Patriots), suicide by gunshot.
Endang Rahayu Sedyaningsih, 57, Indonesian physician, Minister of Health (2009–2012), cancer.
Akira Tonomura, 70, Japanese physicist, pancreatic cancer. (Japanese)
Lourdes Valera, 58, Venezuelan actress, lung cancer.
Digby Wolfe, 82, British actor and screenwriter (Rowan & Martin's Laugh-In), cancer.
Zvi Zeitlin, 90, Belarusian-born American classical violinist, pneumonia.

3
Edith Bliss, 52, Australian pop singer and television presenter, lung cancer.
Lloyd Brevett, 80, Jamaican double bassist (The Skatalites), complications from stroke.
Elizabeth Busche, 20, American curler, cancer.
Peter K. Cullins, 83, American admiral, first commander of the Naval Data Automation Command, complications from hepatitis B.
John Miles Foley, 65, American folklorist and literary scholar.
Jorge Illueca, 93, Panamanian politician, President (1984), respiratory failure. 
Andrew Suknaski, 69, Canadian poet and visual artist.
Richie Thomson, 71, New Zealand Olympic cyclist.
František Tondra, 75, Slovak Roman Catholic prelate, Bishop of Spiš (1989–2011), heart failure. 
Tú Duyên, 96, Vietnamese painter.
Felix Werder, 90, German-born Australian composer.

4
Haukur Angantýsson, 63, Icelandic chess player. 
Harriet Berger, 94, American political scientist.
T. P. Chandrasekharan, 51, Indian politician, assassinated (hacked).
Aleksandre Chikvaidze, 74, Georgian diplomat.
Neville Coleman, 74, Australian underwater nature photographer.
Gert Frischmuth, 79, German choral conductor and music educator.
Angelica Garnett, 93, British writer and painter.
Crawford Hallock Greenewalt, Jr., 74, American archaeologist.
Mort Lindsey, 89, American orchestra leader and composer.
Anthony O'Connell, 73, Irish-born American Roman Catholic prelate, Bishop of Knoxville (1988–1998) and Palm Beach (1998–2002).
Edward Short, Baron Glenamara, 99, British politician, Deputy Leader of the Labour Party (1972–1976), MP for Newcastle upon Tyne Central (1951–1976).
Bob Stewart, 91, American television game show producer (Password, To Tell the Truth, The Price Is Right), natural causes.
Adam Yauch, 47, American musician (Beastie Boys) and film director (Gunnin' for That No. 1 Spot), salivary gland cancer.
Rashidi Yekini, 48, Nigerian footballer.

5
Ramón Arano, 72, Mexican baseball player. 
Stevan Bena, 76, Serbian footballer. 
Frederick J. Brown, 67, American artist. 
Count Carl Johan Bernadotte of Wisborg, 95, Swedish royal, youngest son of King Gustaf VI Adolf of Sweden.
James R. Browning, 93, American senior (former chief) judge of the Court of Appeals for the Ninth Circuit.
Marguerite S. Chang, 88, Chinese-born American research chemist and inventor.
Reg Cutler, 77, English footballer.
Aatos Erkko, 79, Finnish journalist and publisher, after long illness.
Florida Pearl, 20, Irish racehorse, winner of the Champion Bumper (1997), euthanized.
George Knobel, 89, Dutch football manager, complications of Alzheimer's disease. 
Don Leshnock, 65, American baseball player (Detroit Tigers).
Michail Markov, 73, Russian cyclist and coach.
Meow, c. 2, American cat, heaviest cat at his time of death, lung failure.
Miguel Mora Gornals, 75, Spanish Olympic cyclist. 
Roy Padayachie, 62, South African politician.
Mendel Sachs, 85, American theoretical physicist.
Ivica Šangulin, 75, Croatian football player and manager.
Surendranath, 75, Indian cricketer.
Ali Uras, 88, Turkish Olympic basketball player and president of Galatasaray S.K. (1979–1986).

6
Lubna Agha, 63, Pakistani-American artist, cancer.
Fahd al-Quso, 37, Yemeni militant, al-Qaeda member, airstrike.
Vagn Andersen, 74, Danish sports shooter.
Tyrone Breuninger, 73, American trombonist.
Michael Burks, 54, American blues musician, heart attack.
François Chevalier, 98, French historian.
Ekalavyan, 77, Indian writer.
Pat Frink, 67, American basketball player (Cincinnati Royals), automobile accident.
Jerry H. Geisler, 77, American lawyer and politician.
Iraj Ghaderi, 77, Iranian film director and actor. 
Kåre Øistein Hansen, 84, Norwegian politician.
James Isaac, 51, American film director, producer (Jason X, Skinwalkers) and special effects supervisor, multiple myeloma and blood cancer.
Kostas Karras, 76, Greek actor, MP (2000–2007), prostate cancer. 
Félix Kouadjo, 73, Ivorian Roman Catholic prelate, Bishop of Bondoukou (since 1996).
Jean Laplanche, 87, French psychoanalyst, pulmonary fibrosis, 
George Lindsey, 83, American actor (The Andy Griffith Show, Mayberry R.F.D., Hee Haw), after brief illness.
Georgi Lozanov, 85, Bulgarian educator, developed Suggestopedia.
Marika Mitsotakis, 82, Greek politician, wife of the Greek Prime Minister Konstantinos Mitsotakis (1990–1993), complications of poliomyelitis.
John Slack, 81, English cricketer and judge.
Yale Summers, 78, American actor (Daktari).
Tran Dinh Truong, 80, Vietnamese businessman. (Vietnamese)
Jan Trøjborg, 56, Danish politician, member of the Folketing (1987–2005), and Defence Minister (2000–2001), heart failure.
John Worrall, 84, New Zealand cricketer.

7
Ivan Allen, 81, American ballet dancer (Metropolitan Opera).
Ferenc Bartha, 68, Hungarian economist, Governor of the National Bank of Hungary (1988–1990), suicide.
Sammy Barr, 80, Scottish trade union leader.
Norbert Becker, 74, German agricultural scientist.
Jules Bocandé, 53, Senegalese footballer, complications of surgery and stroke.
Rich Buhler, 65, American radio personality, pancreatic cancer.
R. Michael Canjar, 58, American mathematician.
Robert Everett Coyle, 82, American senior (former chief) judge of the District Court for the Eastern District of California.
Andrea Crisanti, 75, Italian production designer and art director.
Dennis E. Fitch, 69, American pilot (United Airlines Flight 232), brain cancer.
Virgil Frye, 81, American actor and boxer, Pick's Disease.
Kimitada Hayase, 71, Japanese track and field athlete (1960 Summer Olympics, 1964 Summer Olympics), blood poisoning. 
Alexander Keynan, 90, Israeli microbiologist, co-founder and the first director of Israel Institute for Biological Research. 
 Eva Rausing, 48, American philanthropist.
Gene Visich, 85, American AAGPBL baseball player.

8
Ampon Tangnoppakul, 64, Thai detainee, cancer.
Bobby Bulch, 79, English footballer.
William Aquin Carew, 89, Canadian Roman Catholic prelate, Apostolic Nuncio to Japan (1983–1997).
Oscar M. Corbin Jr., 94, American politician.
Yves Courrière, 76, French writer, biographer and journalist.
Aimée Danis, 82, Canadian film director and producer.
Isabel Gago, 98, Portuguese engineer.
Nan Giese, 90, Australian educator and artist.
Nicholas Katzenbach, 90, American lawyer, United States Attorney General (1965–1966).
Lau Teng Chuan, 83, Singaporean sports administrator, stomach cancer.
Everett Lilly, 87, American bluegrass musician (The Lilly Brothers).
Carlos Loiseau, 63, Argentine cartoonist, colorectal cancer.
Sergio Marqués Fernández, 65, Spanish politician, President of the Principality of Asturias (1995–1999).
Bob Marshall, 77, American politician. Mayor of San Bruno, California (1980–1991).
Jerry McMorris, 71, American baseball executive (Colorado Rockies), pancreatic cancer.
Frank Parr, 83, English cricketer and jazz musician.
Louis H. Pollak, 89, American senior judge of the District Court for the Eastern District of Pennsylvania.
Ingvill Raaum, 76, Norwegian politician. 
George Stephen Ritchie, 97, British war hero and hydrographer.
Stacy Robinson, 50, American football player (New York Giants), cancer.
Robert de La Rochefoucauld, 88, French Resistance member.
Maurice Sendak, 83, American author and illustrator (Where the Wild Things Are, Little Bear), complications of a stroke.
Roman Totenberg, 101, Polish-born American violinist, renal failure.
Vo Rogue, 28, Australian Thoroughbred racehorse, winner of the Australian Cup (1989, 1990).
Garth Webb, 93, Canadian soldier and museum founder (Juno Beach Centre).

9
Carl Beane, 59, American sports broadcaster and public address announcer (Fenway Park), heart attack.
James Carter, 100, American basketball coach (University of Dayton).
Bertram Cohler, 73, American psychologist.
Danilo De Girolamo, 56, Italian voice actor, heart attack.
Alfred Doll-Steinberg, 78, Austrian-born British chemical engineer.
Gunnar Dybwad, 83, Norwegian footballer. 
Alain Fossoul, 83, Belgian footballer, 
Hernán Haddad, 83, Chilean Olympic athlete.
Sir Geoffrey Henry, 71, Cook Islands politician, Prime Minister (1983, 1989–1999), and Speaker of Parliament (since 2011), cancer.
Northerly, 15, Australian racehorse, winner of the Australian Cup (2001, 2003) and Cox Plate (2001, 2002), euthanized.
Constantin Piron, 80, Belgian physicist. 
Vidal Sassoon, 84, British hairstylist, leukemia.
Ingvald M. Smith-Kielland, 92, Norwegian royal servant.
Lajos Somodi, Sr., 83, Hungarian Olympic bronze medallist fencer (1956).

10
Edward Abramson, 91, American politician.
George Birimisa, 88, American playwright, actor, and director.
Ningali Cullen, 69–70, Australian activist.
Barbara D'Arcy, 84, American visual merchandiser.
Peter David, 60, British journalist, (The Economist) traffic collision.
Horst Faas, 79, German photojournalist (Associated Press).
Ranjitsinh Pratapsinh Gaekwad, 74, Indian politician, member of the Lok Sabha (1980–1989), Maharaja of Baroda (since 1988).
Evelyn Bryan Johnson, 102, American aviator.
Günther Kaufmann, 64, German film actor, heart attack.
Pekka Marjamäki, 64, Finnish Olympic ice hockey player, heart attack.
Eddie Perkins, 75, American former world light welterweight champion boxer.
Joyce Redman, 96, Irish-born British actress (Othello, Tom Jones), pneumonia.
Bernardo Sassetti, 41, Portuguese jazz pianist and film composer, fall. 
Carroll Shelby, 89, American automobile racer and designer.
Andreas Shipanga, 80, Namibian politician, Chairman of the Transitional Government of National Unity (1987, 1988), heart attack.
Gunnar Sønsteby, 94, Norwegian resistance movement member.
Walter Wink, 76, American theologian, complications of dementia.
Gulumbu Yunupingu, 69, Australian Aboriginal artist.

11
Soungalo Bagayogo, 70, Malian Olympic boxer.
Alma Bella, 102, Filipino actress.
Jack Benaroya, 90, American real estate developer.
Sherman A. Bernard, 86, American businessman.
Patrick Bosch, 47, Dutch footballer (FC Twente), car accident. 
Stanislav Brebera, 86, Czech chemist. 
Les Carr, 82, Australian football player.
Sheila Conroy, 94, Irish trade union leader and activist.
Dankwart Danckwerts, 79, German sociologist. 
Tony DeZuniga, 79, Filipino comic book artist and co-creator of Jonah Hex and Black Orchid, complications from stroke.
Alfred Diamant, 94, Austrian-born American political scientist.
Leela Roy Ghosh, 64, Indian actress and voice-dubbing artist, complications of liver transplant surgery.
Rose Mary Glaser, 90, American AAGPBL baseball player.
Thea Hochleitner, 86, Austrian Olympic bronze medal-winning (1956) alpine skier. 
Grant Jeffrey, 63, Canadian Bible teacher and writer.
Rodolfo Kappenberger, 95, Swiss footballer.
Sir Michael Kerry, 88, British public servant, Treasury Solicitor (1980–1984).
Annemarie Roeper, 93, Austrian-born American educator, co-founder of the Roeper School, pneumonia.
László Seregi, 82, Hungarian dancer and choreographer. 
Roland Shaw, 91, British bandleader and music arranger.
Martin Stovold, 56, English cricketer.
Travis H. Tomlinson, 98, American politician, Mayor of Raleigh, North Carolina (1965–1969).
Frank Wills, 53, American baseball player (Toronto Blue Jays, Kansas City Royals, Cleveland Indians).

12
Jan Bens, 91, Dutch footballer (Feyenoord).
Frank Bethwaite, 91, New Zealand boat designer, author and meteorologist.
Ferrin C. Campbell, 88, American politician.
Paul Cyr, 48, Canadian hockey player (Buffalo Sabres, New York Rangers, Hartford Whalers), heart failure.
Paul Dee, 65, American lawyer and athletic director (University of Miami).
Ernst Josef Fittkau, 84, German entomologist. 
Ruth Foster, 92, American actress (Little House on the Prairie).
Richard Gerrard-Wright, 82, British Army officer.
Terry Martin, 74, American surfboard shaper.
Neil McKenty, 87, Canadian radio talk-show host and author.
Donald Nicholson, 96, British biochemist.
Eddy Paape, 91, Belgian comics artist (Luc Orient). (Dutch)
Harold Arthur Poling, 86, American businessman, CEO and Chairman of Ford Motor Company (1990–1993).
Sam Porcello, 76, American food scientist, created the Oreo cookie filling.
Ken Selby, 76, American businessman, founder of Mazzio's, complications from lung cancer.
Fritz Ursell, 89, German-born British mathematician (Ursell number).

13
Trond Bråthen, 34, Norwegian singer and guitarist (Urgehal), natural causes.
William G. Braud, 69, American psychologist and parapsychologist.
Marek Cichosz, 32, Polish cyclist. 
Arsala Rahmani Daulat, Afghan politician, Afghan High Peace Council member, shot.
Donald "Duck" Dunn, 70, American bass guitarist (The Blues Brothers, Booker T. & the M.G.'s).
Paul Engstad, 85, Norwegian writer and politician.
Ada Maria Isasi-Diaz, 69, American theologian, cancer.
Les Leston, 91, British racing driver.
Andy Mate, 72, American soccer player.
Jean McFarlane, Baroness McFarlane of Llandaff, 86, British nurse and peer.
Nguyễn Văn Thiện, 106, Vietnamese Roman Catholic prelate, Bishop of Vĩnh Long (1960–1968).
Lee Richardson, 33, British speedway rider, race crash.
Nolan Richardson III, 47, American college basketball coach (Tennessee State University).
Don Ritchie, 85, Australian volunteer, rescued 160 people from suicide.
Jack Simcock, 82, British artist.
Bill Walsh, 84, American football player (Pittsburgh Steelers).
Trevor Young, 86, New Zealand politician, MP for Hutt (1968–1978); Eastern Hutt (1978–1990).

14
Vladimer Aptsiauri, 50, Georgian Olympic gold medal-winning (1988) fencer.
Burgess Carr, 76, Liberian-born American priest, religious leader, and professor, Lewy bodies disease.
Joséphine Catapano, 93, American perfumer.
Horia Damian, 90, Romanian painter and sculptor.
Tor Marius Gromstad, 22, Norwegian footballer (Stabæk), fall. (body discovered on this date; Norwegian)
Mitchell Guist, 48, American reality series cast member (Swamp People), natural causes.
Derek Hammond-Stroud, 86, English opera singer.
Ernst Hinterberger, 80, Austrian author and screenwriter (Kaisermühlen Blues, Ein echter Wiener geht nicht unter).
Taruni Sachdev, 14, Indian film actress (Paa), plane crash.
Mario Trejo, 86, Argentine poet.
Belita Woods, 63, American funk singer (Brainstorm, Parliament-Funkadelic), heart failure.

15
Henry Denker, 99, American novelist and playwright, lung cancer.
Carlos Fuentes, 83, Panamanian-born Mexican novelist, internal hemorrhage.
Jean Craighead George, 92, American children's author (Julie of the Wolves, My Side of the Mountain), heart failure.
Peter Koslowski, 59, German philosopher and academic. (German)
Arno Lustiger, 88, Upper Silesian-born German writer and Judaic historian.
Zakaria Mohieddin, 93, Egyptian politician and military officer, Vice President (1961–1964, 1965–1968), Prime Minister (1965–1966).
John Murray, 11th Duke of Atholl, 83, South African-born hereditary peer of the Peerage of Scotland.
Dominique Rolin, 99, Belgian author. 
Sir Roy Shaw, 93, British arts administrator.
Frederick E. Smith, 93, British author (633 Squadron), heart attack.
Ángel Alfredo Villatoro, 47, Honduran journalist and radio personality, killed.
Horst Walter, 75, German artist.
George Wyllie, 90, Scottish sculptor.

16
Patricia Aakhus, 59, American novelist, cancer.
James Abdnor, 89, American politician, U.S. Representative (1973–1981) and U.S. Senator (1981–1987) from South Dakota.
Dwight Bentel, 103, American journalist and professor.
Jože Bertoncelj, 90, Slovenian alpine skier.
Maria Bieşu, 76, Moldovan opera singer, leukemia. 
Barry Blaikie, 77, Australian politician.
Chuck Brown, 75, American singer and musician ("Bustin' Loose"), multiple organ failure.
Warren Bruno, 63, American restaurateur.
Ernie Chan, 71, Filipino-born American comic book artist (Batman, Doctor Strange, Conan the Barbarian).
Pat Dickie, 93, Australian politician, member of the Victorian Legislative Council for Ballarat (1956–1978).
Doug Dillard, 75, American bluegrass musician (The Dillards) and actor (The Andy Griffith Show), lung infection.
Kurt Felix, 71, Swiss television presenter, thymoma. 
Hans Geister, 83, German Olympic bronze medallist relay runner (1952). 
Hugo Gottfrit, 61, Argentine football player. 
Kevin Hickey, 56, American baseball player (Chicago White Sox, Baltimore Orioles), complications of a seizure.
Andrei Mylnikov, 93, Russian painter. 
Thad Tillotson, 71, American baseball player (New York Yankees, Nakai Hawks).
Anne Warner, 71, British biologist, cerebral haemorrhage.
Brixton Karnes, 52, American actor ("Team Knight rider"), pneumonia

17
Warda Al-Jazairia, 72, Algerian singer, cardiac arrest.
Marion C. Bascom, 87, American civil rights leader, heart attack.
Herbert Breslin, 87, American music industry executive, heart attack.
France Clidat, 79, French classical pianist.
James Doss, 73, American writer.
Gideon Ezra, 74, Israeli politician, MK (since 1996), lung cancer.
Patrick Mafisango, 32, Congolese-born Rwandan footballer, car accident.
Stepan Pogosyan, 80, Armenian historian and politician. 
Derek Round, 77, New Zealand journalist, injuries following assault. (body discovered on this date)
Ron Shock, 69, American stand-up comedian, urethral cancer.
Donna Summer, 63, American singer ("Bad Girls", "Hot Stuff", "Last Dance", "I Feel Love"), lung cancer.
Harald Synnes, 81, Norwegian politician.
Marcy Tigner, 90, American Christian children's entertainer.
Sir Moti Tikaram, 87, Fijian judge and ombudsman.

18
Arthur Bertram Court, 84, Australian botanist.
Dick Everitt, 90, English footballer.
Dietrich Fischer-Dieskau, 86, German baritone and conductor.
Tom Fuentes, 63, American political leader, Orange County Republican Party chairman (1985–2004), liver cancer.
Marco Antonio Ávila García, 39, Mexican crime reporter, strangulation.
Peter Jones, 49, British drummer (Crowded House), brain cancer.
Justo Justo, 70, Filipino columnist and politician.
Eugene Lacritz, 82, American conductor.
Hans-Dieter Lange, 85, German TV journalist. 
Alan Oakley, 85, British designer of Raleigh Chopper bicycle, cancer.
Paul O'Sullivan, 48, Canadian comedian and actor, car accident.
Gavin Packard, 48, British-born Indian Bollywood film actor, respiratory disease.
A. Teeuw, 90, Dutch critic of Indonesian literature.

19
Willard Bond, 85, American painter.
Bob Boozer, 75, American Olympic gold medal-winning (1960) basketball player (New York Knicks, Chicago Bulls), brain aneurysm.
Rudolf Braun, 82, Swiss historian.
Tamara Brooks, 70, American choral conductor, heart attack.
Ian Burgess, 81, British racing driver.
Muriel Cerf, 61, French writer, cancer. 
Jacques Clancy, 92, French actor.
Isak Doera, 80, Philippines-born Indonesian Roman Catholic prelate, Bishop of Sintang (1976–1996).
John Guest, 73, British geologist.
Ranjit Kumar Gupta, 93, Indian police chief.
Gerhard Hetz, 69, German Olympic silver and bronze medal-winning (1964) swimmer.
Phil Lamason, 93, New Zealand Air Force officer.
Ann Rosener, 97, American photojournalist.

20
Safiuddin Ahmed, 89, Bangladeshi painter and printmaker.
Abdelbaset al-Megrahi, 60, Libyan terrorist, convicted of bombing Pan Am Flight 103, prostate cancer.
Jacqueline Ayer, 82, American author, illustrator, fashion and textile designer.
Bob Bethell, 69, American politician, Kansas State Representative (since 1999), car accident.
Alan Britton, 89, New Zealand cricketer.
Louis F. Burns, 92, American tribal and Osage Nation historian.
Leela Dube, 89, Indian anthropologist.
Geoffrey Evans, 69, Irish serial killer.
John George, 81, Scottish officer of arms.
Robin Gibb, 62, British singer and songwriter (Bee Gees), liver and kidney failure.
Ernestine Glossbrenner, 79, American educator and politician.
Nils Jernsletten, 77, Norwegian linguist. (Norwegian)
David Littman, 78, British historian and human rights activist.
Bholabhai Patel, 77, Indian Gujarati author.
Eugene Polley, 96, American engineer, inventor of the wireless TV remote control.
Howie Richmond, 94, American music publisher and executive.
David Ridgway, 74, British archaeologist.
Raul Rojas, 70, American former WBA featherweight champion boxer.
Carrie Smith, 86, American blues and jazz singer.
Andrew B. Steinberg, 53, American lawyer.
Svenn Stray, 90, Norwegian politician, Minister of Foreign Affairs (1970–1971, 1981–1986).
Sultana Zaman, 76, Bangladeshi actress.

21
Bahram Alivandi, 83–84, Iranian-born Austrian artist.
Andreas Arntzen, 83, Norwegian barrister.
C.C. Banana, 43, American comedian, suicide.
Kevin Barry, 62, New Zealand rugby league player.
Eddie Blazonczyk, 70, American polka musician, natural causes.
Otis Clark, 109, American evangelist, oldest known survivor of the 1921 Tulsa race riot, and butler (Clark Gable, Joan Crawford), natural causes.
Constantine of Irinoupolis, 75, American Orthodox hierarch, Primate of the Ukrainian Orthodox Church of the USA (since 1993).
Heiko Daxl, 54, German media artist. 
Roman Dumbadze, 48, Georgian rebel commander, shooting.
Giovinella Gonthier, 63, Seychellian teacher, concierge, diplomat, author, and consultant.
Heinrich Holland, 84, German-born American scientist. 
Ezell Lee, 74, American politician, Mississippi State Representative (1988–1992) and State Senator (1992–2012), cancer.
Master Oats, 26, British Thoroughbred racehorse, winner of the Cheltenham Gold Cup (1995), myocardial infarction.
Juan Manuel Montero Vázquez, 64, Spanish military surgeon. 
Douglas Rodríguez, 61, Cuban boxer, heart attack.
Bill Stewart, 59, American football coach (West Virginia University), apparent heart attack.
Alan Thorne, 73, Australian anthropologist, developer of the theory of multiregional origin of modern humans, Alzheimer's disease.
Rodolfo Félix Valdés, 86, Mexican politician, Governor of Sonora (1985–1991). (Spanish)

22
Muzaffar Ahmed, 79, Bangladeshi economist, natural causes.
Muzafar Bhutto, 41, Pakistani Sindhi nationalist politician.
Juanita Boisseau, 100, American dancer.
Wesley A. Brown, 85, American naval officer, first African-American graduate of the U.S. Naval Academy, cancer.
Michael Bryson, 69, American reporter.
Janet Carroll, 71, American singer and actress (Risky Business, Married... with Children, Murphy Brown), brain cancer.
Daehaeng, 85, Korean Buddhist nun.
Chico Formiga, 81, Brazilian footballer and manager, heart attack.
Shiu-Ying Hu, 102, Chinese botanist.
Henrik Kalocsai, 71, Hungarian Olympic track and field athlete. (Hungarian)
Flinder Anderson Khonglam, 67, Indian politician and physician, Chief Minister of Meghalaya (2001–2003).
Albion W. Knight, Jr., 87, American army officer, bishop and politician.
Dave Mann, 79, American football player (Chicago Cardinals, Toronto Argonauts), complications from dementia.
Hazel Monteith, 94, Jamaican consumer rights advocate.
John Moores, Jr., 83, English businessman, Chancellor of Liverpool John Moores University (1994–1999).
Elaine Mulqueen, 80, American children's television host and personality.
Edmund Potrzebowski, 85, Polish Olympic athlete.
Janet Lees Price, 69, British actress (Blake's 7, Z-Cars).
Ernie Smith, 81, American Negro league baseball player.
Mike Voight, 58, American football player.
Sir Derek Wanless, 64, British banker and public policy adviser, pancreatic cancer.
Jesse Whittenton, 78, American football player (Green Bay Packers, Los Angeles Rams).
Hidekazu Yoshida, 98, Japanese music critic and literary critic.

23
T. Garry Buckley, 89, American politician, Vermont State Senator (1955–1965), Lieutenant Governor (1977–1979).
Aub Carrigan, 94, Australian cricketer.
Gyula Elek, 80, Hungarian handball player and coach. 
Sattareh Farmanfarmaian, 91, Iranian writer and princess. 
Paul Fussell, 88, American literary scholar and social critic, natural causes.
Millie Goldsholl, 92, American film director and producer.
Hal Jackson, 96, American disc jockey and radio personality.
Leonel Mitchell, 81, American liturgical scholar.
William C. Wampler, 86, American politician, U.S. Representative for Virginia (1953–1955, 1967–1983).

24
Ursula Arnold, 83, German photographer.
George Ceithaml, 81, American football player.
Klaas Carel Faber, 90, Dutch-born Nazi war criminal, kidney failure.
Kathi Kamen Goldmark, 63, American writer, cancer.
James Arnot Hamilton, 89, British aircraft designer.
Jacqueline Harpman, 82, Belgian writer. (French)
Hermengild Li Yi, 88, Chinese Roman Catholic prelate, Bishop of Lu'an (since 1998).
Juan Francisco Lombardo, 86, Argentine football player. (Spanish)
Toby Maduot, 78, Sudanese politician.
Mark McConnell, 50, American drummer (Sebastian Bach, Blackfoot), multiple organ failure.
Ndombe Opetum, 68, Congolese musician. 
William Rathje, 66, American archaeologist.
Lee Rich, 93, American television executive and producer (The Waltons, Dallas), co-founder of Lorimar Television, lung cancer.

25
R. Dilip, 56, Indian actor, heart attack.
Robert Fossier, 84, French historian.
Keith Gardner, 82, Jamaican Olympic bronze medal-winning (1960) athlete, complications of surgery and stroke.
Alistair Hamilton, 77, Scottish lawyer, scout leader and banker.
William Hanley, 80, American screenwriter and playwright.
Edoardo Mangiarotti, 93, Italian Olympic gold medal-winning (1936, 1952, 1956, 1960) fencer.
Peter D. Sieruta, 63, American writer and critic, complications due to a fall. 
Beatrice Sparks, 95, American therapist and writer.
Doug Walton, 65–66, English rugby league player.
Lou Watson, 88, American basketball player and coach (Indiana University).

26
Zvi Aharoni, 91, German-born Israeli Mossad agent.
Orhan Boran, 84, Turkish television host, bone marrow cancer.
Arthur Decabooter, 75, Belgian professional racing cyclist, heart attack. 
Leo Dillon, 79, American comic book illustrator (Why Mosquitoes Buzz in People's Ears), complications from lung surgery.
Anna-Lisa Eriksson, 83, Swedish Olympic bronze medal-winning (1956) cross-country skier. 
Omar Muhammad Farah, 36–37, Somali teacher and politician, road accident.
Stephen Healey, 29, British Army officer and footballer (Swansea City), improvised explosive device.
Hiroshi Miyazawa, 90, Japanese politician, Minister of Justice (1995), Governor of Hiroshima Prefecture (1973–1981), natural causes. 
Jean Morton, 91, British television presenter.
Hans Schmidt, 87, Canadian professional wrestler.
Jim Unger, 75, English-born Canadian cartoonist (Herman).
Roy Wilson, 72, Jamaican singer (Higgs and Wilson).

27
Dee Caruso, 83, American television writer (Get Smart, The Monkees), pneumonia.
Simeon Daniel, 77, Kittitian politician, first Premier of Nevis (1983–1992).
Octiabr' Emelianenko, 85, Soviet Russian physicist.
Friedrich Hirzebruch, 84, German mathematician.
Zita Kabátová, 99, Czech actress.
Richard Wall Lyman, 88, American educator and historian, President of Stanford University (1970–1980), heart failure.
William Lee Miller, 86, American historian.
David Rimoin, 75, American geneticist, pancreatic cancer.
Earl Shorris, 75, American writer and social critic.
Johnny Tapia, 45, American former triple world champion boxer.
Jan de Vries, 88, Canadian army veteran.

28
Pierre Allès, 95, Algerian racing cyclist.
Don Anthony, 83, British Olympic hammer thrower.
Gregorio Baro, 83, Argentine chemist.
Ed Burton, 72, American basketball player.
Hugh Dawnay, 79, English soldier and polo player.
Rheta DeVries, 75, American psychologist.
Bob Edwards, 86, British journalist.
Richard Killen, 82, Australian politician, member of the New South Wales Legislative Council (1981–1991).
Judith Nelson, 72, American opera singer.
Harry Parker, 64, American baseball player (St. Louis Cardinals, New York Mets, Cleveland Indians).
Ludovic Quistin, 28, Guadeloupean footballer (Tamworth), traffic accident.
Yuri Susloparov, 53, Ukrainian-born Russian football player and coach. 
Emmanuel David Tannenbaum, 33, Israeli scientist.
Matthew Yuricich, 89, American special effects artist (Field of Dreams, Close Encounters of the Third Kind, Blade Runner).

29
Toni Arden, 88, American singer.
André Bernier, 81, Canadian politician and accountant.
Frederick Gehring, 64, American mathematician.
Dick Beals, 85, American voice actor (Davey and Goliath, Speedy Alka-Seltzer).
Vince Cardell, 73, American pianist.
Maureen Dunlop de Popp, 91, Argentinian-born British aviator.
Elizabeth Ewen, American historian.
John Fredriksson, 88, Swedish alpine skier.
Nasir Gadžihanov, 45, Macedonian Olympic wrestler.
Cassandra Jardine, 57, British journalist, cancer.
Mark Minkov, 67, Russian composer. 
Mohamed Taieb Naciri, 73, Moroccan lawyer and politician. 
Jim Paratore, 58, American television producer (TMZ, The Ellen DeGeneres Show, The Rosie O'Donnell Show), heart attack.
Ivor Porter, 98, British diplomat.
Ola O. Røssum, 86, Norwegian politician. (Norwegian)
Kaneto Shindo, 100, Japanese film director, natural causes.
Doc Watson, 89, American folk and bluegrass musician, complications following surgery.

30
Zahir Alam, 42, Indian cricketer, liver ailment.
Barton Lidice Beneš, 69, American artist.
Jerry Blemker, 67, American baseball coach.
Duane Bryers, 100, American painter, illustrator, and sculptor.
Pierre Ceyrac, 98, French Jesuit missionary.
Tomas Fernandez Concepcion, 78, Filipino politician.
Aldo Conterno, 81, Italian winemaker.
Pete Cosey, 68, American guitarist.
Edi Federer, 57, Austrian ski jumper, amyotrophic lateral sclerosis.
John Fox, 59, American comedian, colon cancer.
Buddy Freitag, 80, American Broadway theatre producer (Dirty Rotten Scoundrels, Catch Me If You Can), brain tumor.
Sir Andrew Huxley, 94, British physiologist, biophysicist, and Nobel laureate (Physiology or Medicine, 1963).
Albertus Klijn, 89, Dutch religious scholar.
Charles Lemmond, 84, American politician, Pennsylvania State Senator (1985–2006).
Farideh Mashini, Iranian feminist activist. (Farsi)
Hamza Ben Driss Ottmani, 72, Moroccan economist and writer.
Mr. Imagination, 64, American outsider artist, blood infection.
Gerhard Pohl, 74, German politician, drowning. (German)
Rekin Teksoy, 84, Turkish lawyer, author and translator. (Turkish)
Jack Twyman, 78, American Hall of Fame basketball player (Rochester/Cincinnati Royals), blood cancer.

31
Natasha Borovsky, 87, Russian American poet and novelist.
Christopher Challis, 93, British cinematographer (Chitty Chitty Bang Bang, Top Secret!, Mary, Queen of Scots).
John H. Ewing, 93, American politician.
Desmond Fernando, 81, Sri Lankan doctor and inventor.
Roger Fournier, 82, Canadian writer and television director.
Farid Habib, 77, Lebanese politician, MP for El Koura (since 2005), illness.
Nélson Jacobina, 58, Brazilian songwriter ("Maracatu Atômico"), lung cancer.
Randall B. Kester, 95, American attorney and judge.
Mark Midler, 80, Russian Olympic gold medal-winning (1960, 1964) foil fencer. 
Paul Pietsch, 100, German Formula One and Grand Prix race car driver, first to reach the age of 100, pneumonia.
Paul Sussman, 45, British journalist (CNN), archaeologist, and author, ruptured aneurysm.
Gareth Walters, 83, Welsh musician.
Orlando Woolridge, 52, American basketball player (Chicago Bulls) and coach (Los Angeles Sparks), heart disease.
Zhou Ruchang, 94, Chinese academic and redologist.

References

2012-05
 05

et:Surnud 2012#Mai
es:Anexo:Fallecidos en 2012#Mayo
no:Dødsfall i 2012#Mai
sv:Avlidna 2012#Maj 2012